This is a list of words that occur in both the English language and the Spanish language, but which have different meanings and/or pronunciations in each language. Such words are called interlingual homographs. Homographs are two or more words that have the same written form.

This list includes only homographs that are written precisely the same in English and Spanish: They have the same spelling, hyphenation, capitalization, word dividers, etc. It excludes proper nouns and words that have different diacritics (e.g., invasion/invasión, pâté/paté).

Relationships between words
The words below are categorised based on their relationship: cognates, false cognates, false friends, and modern loanwords. Cognates are words that have a common etymological origin. False cognates are words in different languages that seem to be cognates because they look similar and may even have similar meanings, but which do not share a common ancestor. False friends do share a common ancestor, but even though they look alike or sound similar, they differ significantly in meaning. Loanwords are words that are adopted from one language into another. Since this article is about homographs, the loanwords listed here are written the same not only in English and Spanish, but also in the language that the word came from.

Many of the words in the list are Latin cognates. Because Spanish is a Romance language (which means it evolved from Latin), many of its words are either inherited from Latin or derive from Latin words. Although English is a Germanic language, it, too, incorporates thousands of Latinate words that are related to words in Spanish. Yet even with so many Latin cognates, only a small minority are written precisely the same in both languages.

Even though the words in this list are written the same in both languages, none of them are pronounced the same—not even the word no.

Cognates
The cognates in the table below share meanings in English and Spanish, but have different pronunciation.

Some words entered Middle English and Early Modern Spanish indirectly and at different times. For example, a Latinate word might enter English by way of Old French, but enter Spanish directly from Latin. Such differences can introduce changes in spelling and meaning.

Although most of the cognates have at least one meaning shared by English and Spanish, they can have other meanings that are not shared. A word might also be used in different contexts in each language.

Arabic cognates

Aymara cognates

 alpaca(s)

German cognates

 zinc

Greek cognates

All of the following Greek cognates are nouns. In addition, gas and gases are verbs in English.

Japanese cognates

Latin cognates

Words with an -a ending

Words with an -able ending

Words with an -al ending
All of the following words are adjectives and/or nouns.

Words with an -ar ending

Words with an -el ending

Words with an -er ending

Words with an -ible ending

Words with an -o ending

Words with an -or ending
All of the following words are adjectives and/or nouns.

Māori cognates

 kiwi(s)

Nahuatl cognates

Proto-Indo-European cognates

Quechua cognates

Russian cognates

 vodka(s)

Sinhalese cognates

 anaconda(s)

Taíno cognates

 iguana(s)

Tamil cognates

 mango(s)

Tupi cognates

Turkish cognates

 fez

Wolof cognates

 banana(s)

False cognates

Although the words in this section are written identically in English and Spanish, they have different meanings in each language, and they are not cognates.

Loanwords
The table below lists English-to-Spanish and Spanish-to-English loanwords, as well as loanwords from other modern languages that share the same orthography in both English and Spanish. In some cases, the common orthography resulted because a word entered the Spanish lexicon via English. These loanwords may retain spelling conventions that are foreign to Spanish (as in whisky). In Spanish, only loanwords use the letters k and w.

English-to-Spanish loanwords

All of the following loanwords are either nouns or gerunds. Words ending in -ing are gerunds in English and nouns in Spanish.

Spanish-to-English loanwords

Although the meanings of the following loanwords overlap, most of them have different senses and/or shades of meaning in Spanish and English. Generally, loanwords have more diverse and nuanced meanings in the originating language than they do in the adopting language.

Loanwords from other languages
The following loanwords occur in both Modern English and Modern Spanish, but originated in another language. Several of the words entered the Spanish language via English.

From Finnish

 sauna(s)

From French

 autoclave(s)
 ballet(s)
 canapé
 postal
 taxi(s)

From Italian

 adagio(s)
 aria(s)
 mafia(s)
 pizza(s)
 ravioli(s)

From Quechua

 llama(s)
 puma(s)

From Swahili

 safari(s)

From Zulu

 impala(s)

See also

 Comparative linguistics
 Homograph
 Pseudo-anglicism

English-specific
 English orthography
 History of English
 Foreign language influences in English
 List of English homographs
 List of Germanic and Latinate equivalents in English
 Lists of English words by country or language of origin
 Longest word in English
 Most common words in English

Spanish-specific
 Spanish orthography
 History of the Spanish language
 Influences on the Spanish language
 Longest word in Spanish
 Most common words in Spanish

Notes

References

External links
 
 

Spanish interlingual homographs
Spanish etymology
Lists of Spanish words of foreign origin